Peter Ester (5 June 1953 – 11 December 2022) was a Dutch sociologist and politician. As a member of the Christian Union he was a member of the Senate from 7 June 2011 until his death. He focused on matters of economic affairs, agriculture, social affairs and employment, finance, infrastructure, natural environment and Kingdom relations.

Ester studied sociology at Utrecht University and got promoted in economics at Erasmus University Rotterdam.

Among others he worked at Vrije Universiteit (Free University Amsterdam), Tilburg University and Utrecht University.

Ester was married and a member of the Protestant Church in the Netherlands (PKN).

Ester died after a long illness on 11 December 2022, at the age of 69.

References 
  Parlement.com biography

External links 
  Senate biography

1953 births
2022 deaths
Christian Union (Netherlands) politicians
21st-century Dutch politicians
Dutch sociologists
Erasmus University Rotterdam alumni
Members of the Senate (Netherlands)
Politicians from Utrecht (city)
Protestant Church Christians from the Netherlands
Academic staff of Tilburg University
Utrecht University alumni
Academic staff of Utrecht University
Academic staff of Vrije Universiteit Amsterdam